Rolling Acres Mall was a shopping mall located in the Rolling Acres area of Akron, Ohio, United States. Built in 1975, it originally included approximately 21 stores, with Sears as the main anchor store. Later expansions added several more stores including anchor stores JCPenney, Montgomery Ward, and O'Neil's, along with a movie theater and food court. Montgomery Ward was converted to Higbee's in 1986, and then to Dillard's in 1992, while O'Neil's became May Company Ohio, Kaufmann's, and then finally Macy's. The fifth anchor store was Target, added in 1995. At its peak, the mall had over 150 stores. It underwent a sharp decline in tenancy throughout the 1990s and into the first decade of the 21st century, resulting in the relocation of Target and closure of Dillard's. Macy's and the mall itself both shuttered in 2008, although Sears remained operational until 2011, and JCPenney as an outlet store until 2013. Rolling Acres Mall was publicized after its closure as an example of a dead mall, and non-retail ventures operated out of the former locations of Target, Sears, and Dillard's. The mall was finally demolished in stages between 2017 and 2019, with Amazon building a distribution facility on the former site soon afterward.

History
Rolling Acres Mall was developed by Forest City Enterprises and Akron, Ohio-based developer Richard B. Buchholzer. The developers chose the  site, along Romig Road on Akron's southwestern side, between 1964 and 1966 after conducting studies which revealed that several major department stores had expressed interest in that area. In 1971, Buchholzer received a $500,000 permit to begin clearing and grading land along Romig Road for the mall's site. Developers also had to acquire two other permits from the city: one to excavate earth required to build the mall, and another for construction. In addition, the city of Akron budgeted $1.1 million toward highway and sewer improvements along Romig Road, to accommodate for the projected traffic increases brought on by the mall's opening. By mid-1973, Sears had been confirmed as the mall's first anchor store. Construction of the mall required the relocation of two natural gas lines. Serving as architect was the Keeva Kekst Association of Cleveland, Ohio.

Due to the slow speed at which Forest City Enterprises had begun land clearing and construction, then-city councilman Ray Kapper sent a letter to the developers in July 1973, threatening to repeal the zoning permit for the mall. Kapper later withdrew the repeal after representatives of Forest City Enterprises agreed to sign an assessment that included written plans for the mall's timeline. At this point, company representative Mel Roebuck had announced that in addition to Sears and 60 other stores, the mall would contain a JCPenney, and that development beyond land clearing would begin within a month. This announcement caused concern among retailers at that plaza, particularly since its other anchor store, a Clarkins discount store, had just closed. Construction of the mall cost over $100 million and employed over 1,200 workers.

1970s
The first phase of the mall, consisting of Sears and 21 other stores, opened to the public on August 6, 1975. Among the tenants open for business on that day were Sears, Rite Aid, Kinney Shoes, Chess King, Thom McAn, Waldenbooks, Claire's, B. Dalton, GNC, The Limited, and Jo-Ann Fabrics. The design of the mall featured a central court known as the Court of Twelve Trees, decorated with twelve Ficus microcarpa trees, along with planters, skylights, and a fountain. Altogether, the mall was to include over 120 tenants.

JCPenney opened its  department store in January 1976, at which point the inner mall had over 50 tenants. In August 1976, General Cinema Corporation opened a three-screen movie theater at the mall, known as the Rolling Acres Cinemas. Construction on O'Neil's department store, located on the south end, began in July 1977, and a  Montgomery Ward opened in October 1977. The mall also included a space along the south wing for a fifth anchor, along with an elevated section along the southern wing known as the Promenade, which included more retail space for a total of 144 stores. Upon opening in 1978, the Promenade section of the mall featured predominantly local and regional shops, along with Motherhood Maternity and Spencer Gifts. Also included in the Promenade was a food court originally known as the Prom-n-Eat, but renamed by 1981 to Picnic Place.

1980searly 1990s
The opening of Montgomery Ward at the mall had resulted in that chain converting its existing Akron-area store at Akron Square Plaza into an outlet store which sold damaged, returned, or overstocked items from other stores. By 1980, the chain had decided to convert all of its eastern Ohio stores, including both Akron locations, to its discount division Jefferson Ward. Under this format, the stores were to include a greater emphasis on self-service shopping, with cash registers located solely at the exits instead of in each department. Montgomery Ward reversed this decision a year later as part of a plan to reassess the chain's profitability. Both stores were closed in early 1986 and the Rolling Acres Mall store was sold to Higbee's, which opened later the same year. The store was the twelfth in the Higbee's chain, and the first new store in over four years. After the store opened, mall management began attracting more fashion-oriented tenants to the mall, including Lane Bryant, Lerner New York, and Limited Express (all then under the same ownership as existing mall tenant The Limited), along with Caren Charles and Petite Sophisticate, two clothing chains then owned by the United States Shoe Corporation. In addition to these, the mall underwent a thorough renovation that replaced its existing earth-toned decor with blue and purple tones, while also undergoing a relandscaping of the exterior. This was followed in 1989 by the acquisition and renaming of the O'Neil's stores to May Company Ohio.

In a cost-cutting measure, Rolling Acres Mall stopped using off-duty police officers and instead relied on cheaper security guards, starting in 1991. During a showing of the film New Jack City, two movie patrons got into a fight outside of the cinema. A panicked crowd ran through the mall after patrons mistook the sound of a metal sign falling over for the sound of a gunshot.

Two anchor stores changed names between 1992 and 1993: Dillard's purchased and renamed the entire Higbee's chain, while May Department Stores Company consolidated the May Company Ohio stores into Kaufmann's, which they also owned at the time. Forest City Enterprises refinanced the mall in 1994, putting the money towards the development of several new restaurants inside the mall's food court. General Cinema Corporation closed the mall's movie theater in mid-1993, saying that it had been unprofitable for years due to its smaller size relative to other multiplex theaters in the area. Prior to the closure, the company had attempted to run it as a discount theater showing second-run movies for 99 cents, but doing so attracted homeless people and urban youth, both of whom would often loiter in the theater for extended periods. Combined with the theater riot two years prior, this caused a preconception among patrons and merchants that the mall had begun catering more heavily to teenagers and to lower-income clientele.

Mid-1990smid-2000s: Addition of Target and decline

The fifth and final anchor store to open at the mall was Target, which began construction in 1994 and opened in 1995. It was connected to the rest of the mall by a  passageway that included new storefronts. This store was part of an expansion by that chain into northeastern Ohio, which was to comprise about 20 stores in total. Target representatives noted that the stores would contain merchandise mixes fitting the stores' demographics, which would be reflected in the Rolling Acres Mall location carrying cosmetics, clothing, and music that would cater to the area's predominantly African-American demographics. Despite the addition of this new store, the mall began losing tenants, and both Dillard's and JCPenney downgraded their respective stores to outlet stores between 1997 and 1999. Although JCPenney had operated several outlet stores at the time, the Rolling Acres Mall store was only the third such one to be converted from a conventional store, and employees of the store at the time told the Akron Beacon Journal that the store had experienced declining sales for many years prior to its conversion.

The mall was sold to Banker Trust of New York in 2000 for $33.5 million, who gave the mall a new logo as well as a website. Also, an independent group called Blind Squirrel Cinema reopened the mall's movie theaters. By November 2001, a buyer was sought by Bankers Trust. In September 2002, North Carolina businessman Heywood Whichard and his family purchased Rolling Acres for $2.75 million. A 2002 news article in The Akron Beacon Journal described the mall and the area around it as having "faltered since the early 1990s" due to perceptions of high crime and lack of renovations to the mall, compared to the renovations that Chapel Hill Mall and Summit Mall had both received in the 1990s. At the time of purchase by Heywood Whichard, Rolling Acres was about 65 percent occupied. The same article also noted that Heywood Whichard had a track record of buying faltering malls at low prices and making no attempt to revitalize them, to the point that many of their properties were ultimately demolished or converted to non-retail use.

2006–2010: Further decline

The first anchor to leave the mall was Target, which relocated to nearby Wadsworth in May 2006. Dillard's closed in August 2006, one month before Kaufmann's was re-branded as Macy's as the parent company of Kaufmann's was acquired. However, it was announced on December 28, 2007 that Macy would close three stores in Ohio, with the Rolling Acres Mall location being one of the three. The store's final day of business was February 16, 2008. Invest Commercial LLC, a company owned by California-based real estate developer Michael Mirharooni, bought the facility in July 2006 for $1.6 million. Invest Commercial bought the mall using a loan from Ezri Namvar's fraudulent Namco Capital Group. At the time of purchase, the mall had about 40 remaining tenants, including Dollar General, MasterCuts, Deb Shops, Bath & Body Works, Zales Jewelers, Subway, Hershey's Ice Cream, GNC, and FootAction USA, along with a number of local independent stores. Under Mirharooni's ownership, proposals were made to convert the mall to offices, light industrial, or call centers. As part of the sale, Invest Commercial also paid over $600,000 in property taxes that had gone unpaid by Heywood Whichard. In April 2007, a homeless man was found living in an abandoned store, with over $30,000 in merchandise that he had stolen from other mall merchants. He had lived there for a month subsisting on power bars and drinks stolen from the GNC fitness supply store.

By October 2008, only eight tenants remained, including Diamond's Menswear and Digital Palace. At this point, all of them were informed that the mall could no longer afford its electricity bill, and it would be closing as soon as possible. On October 31, 2008, the mall closed except for Sears and the JCPenney outlet. Soon afterward, the mall went viral on the internet as an example of retail apocalypse and suburban decline. On April 23, 2009, it was announced that the mall had been auctioned online, and that several people showed interest in buying it for various purposes. The mall was set to be auctioned off on May 1, 2009. No bids were placed for the mall. The building was sold to Premier Ventures LLC of California in November 2010. The company announced plans to use the existing structure. The company did not pay taxes on the property, including the back taxes owed to 2006, and as a result the city of Akron began foreclosure proceedings in September 2013.

201117: Closure and demolition
Shortly after the 2010 sale, Sears announced it would be closing its location at the mall, and it closed on April 3, 2011. JCPenney announced in January 2011 that it would eliminate all outlet stores; nine months later, SB Capital Group purchased all JCPenney Outlet Stores with plans to rename them and continue to operate them, including the Rolling Acres store, under the name JC's 5 Star Outlet. This venture was also unsuccessful, and all of the JC's 5 Star Outlet locations were closed in 2013. On December 31, 2013, the store was closed, which left the entire mall vacant.

A sheriff's sale was set to be held in October 2014, but was called off because of a filed bankruptcy on the part of Premier. The city attempted another sheriff's sale in March 2015 but it was again delayed to June 16, 2015, by an incorrect dismissal of the previous bankruptcy case. On June 16, the mall was once again pulled from sheriff's sale at the last second by a second bankruptcy filing by the owner. Subsequent sheriff's sales on August 6 and October 6 also failed at the last minute by bankruptcy filings. An agreement was reached in November 2015 to force the sale of the mall while legally barring Premier from filing for bankruptcy until two months after sales proceedings ended.

After subsequent sheriff's sales failed in mid-2016, the mall was foreclosed by Summit County on June 26, 2016. This transferred ownership to City of Akron who, the council said they would seek to work with a developer and that the buildings would be demolished. Four former department store buildings are still owned by other companies. In September 2016, the former location of JCPenney was sold to the city of Akron, as it was not demolished until after the rest of the mall. Later in 2017, demolition had finished. The former JCPenney building demolition began in August 2017, with full demolition of the main mall building completed in October. The former Target was in use as a Storage of America facility until 2017. The former Sears hosts Pinnacle Paper Recycling Company, and the former Dillard's hosted Old Main Storage, a private storage company until November 2018.

In 2019, following the property's demolition, it was rumored that Amazon planned to develop a distribution facility on the site of the former mall.  On July 22, 2019, a statement was issued by the city of Akron that Amazon had officially acquired the land. Construction on the new distribution center began in September. Approximately 1,500 jobs were to become available when construction was completed. The center opened on November 1, 2020.

References

External links
Rolling Acres Mall at Deadmalls.com
Extensive photographic coverage and writeup about Rolling Acres Mall
Rolling Acres Mall's Website as of 2003 on the Internet Archive Wayback Machine

Shopping malls in Ohio
Buildings and structures in Akron, Ohio
Shopping malls established in 1975
1975 establishments in Ohio
Shopping malls disestablished in 2008
2008 disestablishments in Ohio
Defunct shopping malls in the United States
Demolished shopping malls in the United States
Demolished buildings and structures in Ohio
Buildings and structures demolished in 2019